The Thao/Ngan are a small group of Taiwanese indigenous peoples who have lived near Sun Moon Lake (Lake Candidius) in central Taiwan for at least a century, and probably since the time of the Qing dynasty. The Thao/Ngan people numbered around 800, making them one of the smallest of all of the recognized indigenous peoples in Taiwan (a number of indigenous peoples, both smaller and larger than the Thao in population, remain unrecognized by the Taiwanese government).

Despite their small group size, the Thao/Ngan have retained their customs, beliefs and traditional culture and language until now, though they have been assimilated into mainstream culture as well. Most of the members of this ethnic group work in the tourism industry at Sun Moon Lake. The Chi-Chi earthquake of 1999 damaged or destroyed 80% of the houses of the Thao/Ngan.

Language
The Thao/Ngan people have their own language, the Thao language, which is nearly extinct and spoken by only a few, mostly elders, of the (already small) Thao ethnic population. The language has been sinicized. Most people who speak Thao are bilingual or trilingual and can speak Mandarin Chinese and/or Taiwanese as well. The Thao/Ngan language is classified as a Northern Formosan language, which is a geographical subgroup of the much larger Austronesian language family. The Thao language has loanwords from the Bunun language, spoken by the Bunun ethnic group of which the Thao/Ngan cooperated with as well as intermarried.

History
According to Thao oral history, the Thao people originally live in Chiayi, later moved to Alishan Range, before eventually settling around Sun Mun Lake as well as Lalu Island in the middle of the lake. According to the legend, they saw a deer and wanted to eat it, so they chased it until they arrived in the side of Sun Moon lake. Then the deer ran into the water, leaving the Thao by themselves. They could only wait. The Thao people then slept at Sun Moon Lake. One of the elders dreamed of a fairy in a white cloak. He said to them "I am the deer that led you here. This place is your promised land. Please don't leave, because generations will come."

Official recognition
On 15 August 2001, the Executive Yuan (Council) of Taiwan officially recognized the Thao/Ngan as the tenth ethnic group among Taiwan's Indigenous peoples. The Thao have been mistakenly regarded as the "Tsou" (a separate and different ethnic group of Aboriginals) since the time of Japanese occupation. The error was caused by both a misunderstanding of the legend saying that "the ancestors of Thao were from the mountain Alishan (Mountain A Li)" and the similar pronunciation of ‘Thao/Ngan’ and ‘Tsou’. Thus, the domain of the Thaos/Ngans had been registered as "Tsous from the flatlands of the mountains" under the nine ethnic groups of Taiwan’s Indigenous peoples.

See also
 Demographics of Taiwan
 Taiwanese indigenous peoples

References

Further reading

External links

Thao/Ngan Homepage
'Home at last!'  The Thao/Ngan return to their ancestral homeland.

Taiwanese indigenous peoples